Kim Clijsters was the defending champion, but retired from the sport on 6 May 2007.

Justine Henin won in the final 4–6, 6–2, 6–4, against Svetlana Kuznetsova.

Seeds
The top four seeds receive a bye into the second round.

Draw

Finals

Top half

Bottom half

External links
 WTA tournament draws

Medibank International Women's Singles
Women's Singles